The Tiger Hotel is a 4-diamond hotel in Columbia, Missouri.  Built in 1928, it was converted to a retirement home and banquet center, before being restored and converted back to a boutique hotel in 2012.  It was listed on the National Register of Historic Places in 1980.

History 
Opened in 1928, the Tiger Hotel was designed by architect Alonzo H Gentry. and constructed by the Simon Construction Company. Upon opening, the 100-room hotel was the first skyscraper to be located between Kansas City and St. Louis.  Due to the hotel's popularity, the "Tiger" sign on top of the building became an icon for both the city of Columbia and surrounding areas.

As the hotel's fortunes declined in the 1960s, it was renovated and renamed the Tiger Hotel to meet the needs of automobile travelers.

In 1987, the Tiger Hotel was taken over by a federal bankruptcy court. It was converted into a retirement home, the Tiger-Kensington, and reopened in 1990. In 2003, it was purchased by Tiger Columns LLC, renamed Tiger Columns. with its ballrooms used as event space. In March 2011, the building was sold to Glyn Laverick, of Columbia Hotel Investments Inc. and it underwent a complete renovation. The restored Tiger Hotel welcomed its first guests when it was still only partially completed, for the True/False Film Festival in March 2012.

On February 1, 2022, the hotel joined the voco Hotels division of InterContinental Hotels Group and was renamed voco The Tiger Hotel.

See also
List of tallest buildings in Columbia, Missouri

References

External links
The Tiger Hotel

Hotel buildings on the National Register of Historic Places in Missouri
Hotel buildings completed in 1928
Hotels established in 1928
1928 establishments in Missouri
Buildings and structures in Columbia, Missouri
Hotels in Columbia, Missouri
National Register of Historic Places in Columbia, Missouri
National Register of Historic Places in Boone County, Missouri
Skyscrapers in Missouri
Skyscraper hotels in Missouri
Skyscrapers in Columbia, Missouri